Albert N. Carlblom (1865–1920) was a North Dakota (United States) public servant and politician with the Republican Party who served as the North Dakota State Auditor from 1899 to 1902.

Biography
Albert Carlblom was born in Cokato, Minn on December 17, 1865. He was the son of John G. and Elizabeth Anderson Carlblom, both natives of Sweden.

He graduated from Gustavus Adolphus College in 1886. He moved to North Dakota in 1891. Following several years of teaching and terms of public office in Sargent County, North Dakota, he married Josephine Peterson in 1898.
 

A year later he became North Dakota State Auditor. After serving two terms as State Auditor, he did not seek re-election to the office in 1902. Instead he chose to return to the prairie and operate the first building constructed in Gwinner, North Dakota. He also joined others in the organizing of the Gwinner State Bank and served as its president. On June 15, 1920, he died at a hospital in Breckenridge from injuries incurred from a cyclone. He is buried at the Gwinner Cemetery in Gwinner, North Dakota. He had three children: Vera Lenore Carlblom, Edna Carlblom Howell, and Albert Carlblom.

See also
 List of North Dakota State Auditors

References

External links 
 Correspondence and Other Papers of Albert N. Carlblom are available for research use at the Gustavus Adolphus College and Lutheran Church Archives.

1865 births
1920 deaths
North Dakota State Auditors
American people of Swedish descent
People from Cokato, Minnesota
People from Sargent County, North Dakota
American Lutherans